Edwin and Nora Payne Bedford House, also known as the Thomas Payne House and Benjamin Smith House, is a historic home located at Fayette, Howard County, Missouri, United States.  It was built about 1860, and is a two-story, three bay, brick I-house with a two-story rear ell.  It features a wide front porch and two level porch along the side of the rear ell. The interior of the house is distinguished by a large amount of ornamental woodwork.

It was listed on the National Register of Historic Places in 1998.  It is located in the South Main Street Historic District.

References

Individually listed contributing properties to historic districts on the National Register in Missouri
Houses on the National Register of Historic Places in Missouri
Houses completed in 1860
Buildings and structures in Howard County, Missouri
National Register of Historic Places in Howard County, Missouri